Joshua Dwayne Smith (born October 11, 1989) is an American former professional baseball pitcher. He played in Major League Baseball (MLB) for the Cleveland Indians and Miami Marlins.

Amateur career
Smith attended Pleasant Hill High School, in Pleasant Hill, Missouri. Smith played college baseball for the Wichita State Shockers baseball team during 2009–2012.

Professional career

Pittsburgh Pirates
The Pittsburgh Pirates selected Smith in the 25th round of the 2012 MLB draft. During his time in the Pirates organization from 2012 through 2016, he played for the Gulf Coast Pirates, State College Spikes, West Virginia Power, Bradenton Marauders, Altoona Curve, and Indianapolis Indians.

Boston Red Sox
On December 8, 2016, Boston Red Sox selected Smith from the Pirates in the minor league phase of the 2016 Rule 5 draft. In 2017 and 2018, he played for the Portland Sea Dogs, and the Pawtucket Red Sox.

Cleveland Indians
Smith elected free agency following the 2018 season and signed a minor league contract with the Cleveland Indians on December 1, 2018.

In 2019, Smith began the season with the Columbus Clippers, the Indians' Triple-A affiliate. The Indians selected Smith's contract on May 25, 2019. He made his major league debut that evening against the Tampa Bay Rays, allowing no earned runs and striking out three batters in  innings. Smith was designated for assignment on September 13, 2019, after he appeared in eight games, striking out 12 in  innings with a 5.40 ERA.

Miami Marlins
On September 14, 2019, the Miami Marlins claimed Smith off waivers. Smith made six appearances with the Marlins, recording an 8.31 ERA and striking out two batters in  innings.

Cincinnati Reds
On October 16, 2019, Smith was claimed off waivers by the Cincinnati Reds. On July 24, 2020, Smith was designated for assignment by the Reds organization.

Miami Marlins (second stint)
On July 27, 2020, Smith was claimed off waivers by the Miami Marlins. On August 29, the Marlins designated Smith for assignment.

Leones de Yucatán
On May 3, 2022, Smith signed with the Leones de Yucatán of the Mexican League. He appeared in 23 games, throwing 23.1 innings with an 8.87 ERA and 20 strikeouts.

On February 20, 2023, Smith retired from professional baseball.

Personal
Smith is often referred to online and in print as Josh D. Smith, to differentiate him from Josh A. Smith, especially since the two players were teammates for the Pawtucket Red Sox in 2018. The two were also teammates for the Miami Marlins in 2020.

See also
Rule 5 draft results

References

External links

1989 births
Living people
Altoona Curve players
Baseball players from Missouri
Bradenton Marauders players
Cleveland Indians players
Columbus Clippers players
Gulf Coast Pirates players
Indianapolis Indians players
Leones de Yucatán players
American expatriate baseball players in Mexico
Leones del Escogido players
American expatriate baseball players in the Dominican Republic
Major League Baseball pitchers
Miami Marlins players
Pawtucket Red Sox players
People from Cass County, Missouri
Portland Sea Dogs players
State College Spikes players
Tigres de Aragua players
American expatriate baseball players in Venezuela
West Virginia Power players
Wichita State Shockers baseball players
St. Cloud River Bats players